John Stanley Greenhalgh (16 July 1898 – July 1987) was an English footballer who played as an inside forward in The Football League with Burnley and Accrington Stanley in the 1920s.

References

Footballers from Bolton
Association football inside forwards
Burnley F.C. players
Barrow A.F.C. players
Accrington Stanley F.C. (1891) players
English Football League players
1898 births
1987 deaths
English footballers